Morazán is a name shared by several places in Central America, all named in honour of 19th century regional statesman Francisco Morazán:

Morazán Department, El Salvador
Francisco Morazán Department, Honduras
 Morazán, Yoro, municipality in Honduras
Morazán, El Progreso, a city in El Progreso Department, Guatemala
Puerto Morazán, a town in Chinandega Department, Nicaragua
Morazán (film), a 2017 Honduran film